is a railway station on the Nagasaki Main Line in Saga, Saga Prefecture, Japan, operated by the Kyushu Railway Company (JR Kyushu). Trains from this station also serve the Sasebo and Karatsu Lines.

Layout
This is an elevated station with two island platforms serving four tracks. The station building and concourse are below the platforms.

Platforms

Adjacent stations

History
It became a through station on 5 May 1895 when the track was extended west to Yamaguchi (today ) and Takeo (today ). When the Kyushu Railway was nationalized on 1 July 1907, Japanese Government Railways (JGR) took over control of the station. On 12 October 1909, the station became part of the Nagasaki Main Line. On 25 May 1935, the station also became part of the Saga Line when the track from Yabekawa (today  to Chikugo-Ōgawa was extended north to Saga. The Saga Line was closed on 28 March 1987. A few days later, with the privatization of Japanese National Railways (JNR), the successor of JGR, on 1 April 1987, control of the station passed to JR Kyushu.

Passenger statistics
In fiscal 2016, the station was used by an average of 12,341 passengers daily (boarding passengers only), and it ranked 9th among the busiest stations of JR Kyushu.

Surrounding area
Saga Station Bus Center

See also
 List of railway stations in Japan

References

External links
  

Nagasaki Main Line
Railway stations in Saga Prefecture
Railway stations in Japan opened in 1891